The Burning Bright is a studio album by singer-songwriter Royal Wood, released by Songs of MapleMusic Publishing. The album was released on March 18, 2014. The lead single, "Forever and Ever", was a top 40 hit in Canada and was the No. 1 most added song on Hot AC Radio.

The Burning Bright was followed three months after its initial release by a companion album called I Wish You Well featuring remixes of songs from The Burning Bright.

References

2014 albums
Royal Wood albums
MapleMusic Recordings albums